Macroeme is a genus of beetles in the family Cerambycidae, containing the following species:

 Macroeme condyla (Martins, 1971)
 Macroeme cylindrica (Thomson, 1857)
 Macroeme plana (Perty, 1832)
 Macroeme priapica (Thomson, 1857)
 Macroeme similis Martins & Galileo, 2011
 Macroeme sobrina Gounelle, 1909
 Macroeme vittipennis (Melzer, 1934)

References

Xystrocerini